Acleris arcuata is a species of moth of the family Tortricidae. It is found in Japan (Honshu).

The wingspan is 14–17 mm.

References

Moths described in 1975
arcuata
Moths of Japan